Melocactus conoideus is a species of plant in the family Cactaceae. It is endemic to Brazil.  Its natural habitat is dry savanna. It is threatened by habitat loss. It is a species of cacti that originates in Vitória da Conquista, located in the southwestern portion of the state of Bahia, Brazil. This species of cactus was discovered by the German émigré Leopold Horst. This species spreads by bearing fruit with seeds that ants take and transport to other locations that it can grow.

References

conoideus
Endemic flora of Brazil
Critically endangered plants
Taxonomy articles created by Polbot